Khaidi No. 150 is a 2017 Indian Telugu-language action drama film directed by V. V. Vinayak and produced by Lyca Productions and Konidela Production Company. The film starred Chiranjeevi and Kajal Aggarwal. It marked Chiranjeevi's return to films in a lead role after a decade, and also his 150th film. The third entry of the Khaidi trilogy, the film is an official remake of the 2014 Tamil film Kaththi.

Produced on a budget of 50 crore, Principal photography began in June 2016 in Hyderabad. The film was released on 11 January 2017, on Sankranthi weekend. It became the second highest-grossing Telugu film of 2017, grossing over  worldwide.

Plot 
In Kolkata, prisoner Kaththi Seenu, a petty criminal, helps the police capture an escaping prisoner, but he himself escapes afterwards. He goes to Hyderabad and decides to escape to Bangkok. However, he drops this plan after meeting and falling in love with Subbalakshmi, his childhood friend at the airport, who dupes him into believing that she gave him her phone number realizing that he has a crush on her. Later, Seenu and his assistant Malli notice a doppelgänger of Seenu named Shankar, being shot by a group of thugs. They admit him to hospital, following which Seenu decides to impersonate the injured Shankar to escape from the police. Under the name of his doppelgänger, Seenu and Malli enter an old-age home run by Shankar with the aim of collecting 25 lakhs (which is meant for the inmates of the old-age home) for their Bangkok trip, until he learns about his doppelgänger's mission.

Shankar is a post-graduate in hydrology from the arid village of Neeruru in Rayalaseema, who had discovered groundwater under some lands of the village which could be used as an irrigation source not only for the village, but for the entire Rayalaseema and the neighbouring areas as well. But, an MNC owned by Aggarwal cheated the villagers into giving their lands for the construction of a factory. Shankar was arrested by the police, and the six villagers commit suicide so as to convince the issue with the media and release of Shankar. On learning of the plight of Shankar and the villagers, Seenu decides to fight for their cause while still under the name of Shankar. The people of the old home and Seenu go to the jury and try to convince him to go in favour of them, but Seenu starts stating rules and scares the main jury person (whom Aggarwal had bribed). Seenu then sends a person (disguised as a hairdresser) to Aggarwal and makes him lay a fingerprint on Aggarwal's neck. After that Aggarwal sends 50 men to kill Seenu, but he soon defeats them using the coins the Lion Club member gave when he was attending a ceremony for him.

Meanwhile, the real Shankar gains consciousness and finds himself in the Kolkata prison where Seenu was locked up. With the help of the man who Seenu helped capture, who has heard his story and has plans to kill Seenu in revenge for getting him caught and thrown back into prison, he soon escapes along with the prisoner's henchmen.

Not knowing that Shankar and the henchmen are headed for Hyderabad, Seenu makes efforts to convince the media to bring the plight of the villagers to the national consciousness, but the media is not interested as they feel that it is not sensational news. A few days later, at the high court, the judge declares the verdict in favour of Seenu and the villagers, but adds that Aggarwal has claimed that certain villagers who are working abroad have shown their support for the factory. If they cannot prove that their support was faked by Aggarwal within the next five days, the verdict will then go in favour of Aggarwal and the villagers will lose their lands. Since the villagers, who have denied supporting the factory, are abroad and cannot come to Hyderabad within five days to rebut Aggarwal's claims, and the verdict is to be decided within five days, Seenu decides to take drastic measures to sensationalize the issue. He, Lakshmi, Malli, and the inmates of the old-age home block water supply to Hyderabad by sitting on the pipelines which carry water to Hyderabad. With the plight of the Hyderabad people due to lack of water supply having gained national attention, Seenu comes out of the pipeline after a few days and highlights the villagers' plight in an emotionally charged speech to the media, which is telecast nationwide and moves many people.

Meanwhile, Shankar and the henchmen reach Hyderabad, but Shankar is soon kidnapped by Aggarwal's henchmen. While in Aggarwal's custody, he sees Seenu's speech on television and is moved by the efforts made by his doppelgänger to help the villagers. On the night before the verdict, Seenu's bluff is exposed, but he assures the old men that he is genuinely interested in their cause, that Shankar is alive and that he will rescue Shankar from Aggarwal and hand him back over to the villagers with the assurance of a positive verdict. Seenu goes to Aggarwal's office, where Shankar is being held. He rescues Shankar and fights Aggarwal. Shankar kills Aggarwal when he is about to kill Seenu. The next day, the verdict is declared in favour of Shankar and the villagers. The Kolkata police find Seenu and arrest him. Seenu assures Lakshmi that he will be back shortly.

Cast 

Chiranjeevi as Kaththi Seenu / Konidela Shiva Shankar Vara Prasad (Double Role)
Kajal Aggarwal as Lakshmi
Tarun Arora as Aggarwal
Brahmanandam as Doberman
Ali as Malli, Seenu's assistant
Posani Krishna Murali as Borabanda Bujji
Prudhviraj as Minister Shekar
Nassar as Lions Club Speaker
Nagendra Babu as Judge
Jaya Prakash Reddy as Commissioner Krishna Murthy
Raghu Karumanchi as Ward Corporator, Borabanda Bujji's brother
Raghu Babu as Raghu, a cook in the old age home
Sarika Ramachandra Rao as Rangaraj, a police officer
Paruchuri Venkateswara Rao as Lawyer
Narsing Yadav as Baasha Bhai
Fish Venkat as Borabanda Bujji's gang member
Mahadevan as old man
V. V. Vinayak – Special appearance as water taking graduate
Lakshmi Rai as an item number "Ratthaalu"
Ram Charan – Special appearance in the song "Ammadu Let's Do Kummudu"
Devi Sri Prasad – Special appearance in the song "Ammadu Let's Do Kummudu"

Production

Development 
Chiranjeevi  150th full-length feature film began filming in April 2016. The film is the remake of 2014 Tamil film, Kaththi, featuring Vijay and Samantha Ruth Prabhu which dealt with issues such as farmer suicides and water scarcity in India. The film was financed by Chiranjeevi's son Ram Charan and producer A. Subashkaran and V. V. Vinayak directed Chiranjeevi for the second time. The Paruchuri Brothers wrote the script based on A.R. Murugadoss' original story. Devi Sri Prasad composed music for the film.

Casting 
The film features Chiranjeevi and Kajal Aggarwal was finalised as the heroine in late July 2016. Tarun Arora was selected as the antagonist for the film.

Filming 
Principal photography commenced on 23 June 2016 as key sequences being shot at Chanchalguda Central Jail in Hyderabad. Later, in August 2016 Chiranjeevi and Kajal joined the shooting at Rajiv Gandhi International Airport, Hyderabad. A special song was shot with Raai Laxmi and Chiranjeevi in October 2016. In November, two songs were shot with the lead pair Chiranjeevi and Kajal in Europe. Raghava Lawrence, Jani Master and Sekhar choreographed the dances. Kanal Kannan and the duo Ram Lakshman choreographed the fights. The visual effects for the film were made by Red Chillies VFX, a subsidiary of Red Chillies Entertainment.

Soundtrack 
The soundtrack album and background score were composed by Devi Sri Prasad. The soundtrack album consists of five tracks.

Box office 
Khaidi No. 150 grossed 50.45 crore on the opening day. KN150 crossed the 95.4 crore mark in 2 days. It grossed over $2.45 million in the USA.  the film has grossed 164 crore.

Critical response 
Times of India gave the film 3 out of 5 writing "Yes, Chiranjeevi is back for sure, although we can’t quite say he’s back with a bang." 123 Telugu gave the film 3.25 writing "On the whole, Khaidi No 150 is a typical mass entertainer. The film is set to take record openings and has everything that we expect from a star hero like Chiranjeevi. He makes a thumping comeback and proves that even at this age he can give every star hero a run for their money. If you ignore the predictable story line and dull climax, Chiru’s one man show, superb songs, and a good message makes this film a good watch this festival season." Indian Express gave the film 3.5 writing "DSP songs do pump up the narrative but a slight disappointment is that dancer Chiru of Indra and Tagore is quite not in shape for a new step. There is modified Veena step and a “buckle lift” step with his son, Ram Charan Teja, who makes a 30-second cameo in a song, but the same agility and lithe is missing."

Great Andhra gave the film 3 out of 5 writing "Over all, "Khaidi No 150" is a film that has some nice mass moments and has dealt on a topical issue with cliched script. It is Chiru's act that works rather than the content of the movie." Firstpost gave the film 3 out of 5 writing "Directed by VV Vinayak, Khaidi No 150's objective, in the end, isn't to really tell an emotional story. It's to announce the return of the Megastar. And it serves its purpose. The story is just bonus. Nothing else matters."

Awards and nominations

References

External links 

2017 films
2010s Telugu-language films
Telugu remakes of Tamil films
Films directed by V. V. Vinayak
Films scored by Devi Sri Prasad
2017 action drama films
2010s masala films
Films set in Andhra Pradesh
Films shot in Andhra Pradesh
Films shot in Hyderabad, India
Films shot in Croatia
Films shot in Slovenia
Films shot in Kolkata
Films shot in Europe
Films about farmers' suicides in India
Indian films about revenge
Films about social issues in India
Indian vigilante films
Indian action drama films
2010s vigilante films
Films about lookalikes